In algebraic topology, a Murasugi sum is a function that relates a finite sequence of surfaces over a disk, which is common to every parallel pair (adjacent), in such a way that it exists in the boundaries of a closed arc. The only place that they are disjoint is at their endpoints, which are also alternating subarcs between the two surfaces' boundaries.

Etymology

Murasugi sums are named after Kunio Marasugi.

Uses

Murasugi sums are primarily a topic of pure mathematics. Murasugi sums can be applied to rather diverse subjects, like most mathematical topics.

References

Algebraic topology